Kwesi Plange (1926 – 1953) was a Ghanaian politician and educationist, He was a founding member of the Convention People's Party (CPP) and the first headmaster of Ghana National College.

Career and politics 
He was a teacher of St. Augustine's College in Cape Coast; his teaching appointment was terminated by the colonial government based on recommendations of the Quarshie-Idun Commission, the commission was set up to investigate the protest of students in Cape Coast schools following the detention in 1948 of "The Big Six". Together with three other teachers, they founded the Ghana National College and Plange become the college's first headteacher from 1948 to 1950.

Plange was active in the politics of the Gold Coast, he was a member of the United Gold Coast Convention. When Kwame Nkrumah founded the Convention People's Party on 12 June 1949, he joined the convention and was a member of its  first Central Committee. In 1951, he was elected to the legislative assembly to represent  Cape Coast municipality on the ticket of CPP. Being the youngest member of the  assembly and he fought for the inclusion of the youth in the politics of the Colony. He proposed amendment to the Coussey Constitution to reduce the voting age from 25 to 21. He was the Ministerial Secretary to the Ministry of Local Government and led the formulation of the Local Governance Ordinance.

Death 
Plange died in 1953. He was replaced on the central committee and the legislative council by Nathaniel Azarco Welbeck.

See also 
 Convention People's Party

References 

1926 births
Convention People's Party (Ghana) politicians
People from Cape Coast
1953 deaths
Ghanaian independence activists
Ghanaian MPs 1951–1954